Balachander (or Balachandar) may refer to:

K. Balachander (1930–2014), Indian film director, screenwriter and producer
S. Balachander (1927–1990), Indian veena player
Sivaramakrishnan Balachandar, an American physicist